Shelved is a Canadian television sitcom, slated to premiere March 6, 2023 on CTV.

Premise
A workplace comedy follows the employees and patrons of the Jameson Branch of the Metropolitan Public Library in Toronto, Ontario.

Cast and characters

Main
 Lyndie Greenwood as branch head Wendy Yarmouth
 Paul Braunstein as assistant branch head Bryce de Laurel
 Dakota Ray Hebert as junior librarian Jacqueline "Jaq" Bedard
 Chris Sandiford as senior librarian Howard Tutt

Recurring
 Robin Duke as Wendy "Unhoused Wendy" Brown, a regular library patron and self-described "wackadoo"
 Taylor Love as Sheila Boyd, a caring community leader and law student working part time at the Settlement Desk
 Varun Saranga as Alvin Canada, an entrepreneur and freelance business consultant

Episodes

References

External links

2020s Canadian sitcoms

CTV Television Network original programming